Ulead Systems is a Taiwanese computer software company headquartered in Neihu district in Taipei, Taiwan. It is a subsidiary of Corel.

History 

Ulead was founded on 5 August 1989 by Lotus Chen, Lewis Liaw and Way-Zen Chen. They founded Ulead with the support of Microtek after leaving Taiwan's Institute for Information Industry in order to further develop and commercialize their first true color image editing software, PhotoStyler, on the Windows platform.

Ulead sold PhotoStyler through Aldus Corporation as a software developer. However, Aldus merged into Adobe Systems in 1994 and PhotoStyler is no longer available. Ulead then continued to develop PhotoImpact 3 as its flagship image editor and sell PhotoImpact by itself.

Ulead Systems then extended its development of multimedia software in various areas such as video editing, media management, web utility, DVD authoring and digital home.

On 17 September 2001, Ulead was listed on the Taiwan Stock Exchange as 2487.TW.

On 13 April 2005, InterVideo acquired Ulead Systems for approximately $68 million. On 9 July 2006, InterVideo announced its merger with Ulead to be completed on 28 December 2006.

On 28 August 2006, Corel announced that it would acquire InterVideo for about $196 million.

On 24 October 2006, Ulead was unlisted on the Taiwan Stock Exchange.

On 12 December 2006, Corel announced the acquisition of InterVideo and Ulead had been completed.

Products

Video 
 VideoStudio
 MediaStudio Pro/VideoGraphics Lab
 VideoTool Box
 COOL 3D, COOL 3D Production Studio

DVD 
 Burn.Now
 DVD MovieFactory
 DVD PictureShow
 DVD WorkShop

Image 
 COOL 360
 COOL 3D
 PhotoImpact
 IPhoto Plus
 Photo Explorer 
 Photo Express 
 My Scrapbook

Web Utility 
 GIF Animator
 GIF-X.Plug-in
 Menu.Applet
 SmartSaver Pro

Pocket Software 
 Pocket SlideShow
 Pocket DV Show

Digital home 
 InstaMedia

See also 
 List of companies of Taiwan
 Ulead MediaStudio Pro
 InterVideo
 Corel

References

External links
Ulead Systems
Ulead Systems Germany
First Look at Ulead Videostudio 11

Software companies of Taiwan
Software companies established in 1989
Companies listed on the Taiwan Stock Exchange
Companies based in Taipei
Taiwanese companies established in 1989
2006 mergers and acquisitions
Taiwanese brands
Corel